Black triangles are UFOs reported as having a triangular shape and dark color, typically observed at night, described as large, silent, hovering, moving slowly, and displaying pulsating, colored lights and can turn their lights off.

British sightings and UK Ministry of Defence Report

A declassified report from the UK Ministry of Defence, addressing Unidentified Aerial Phenomena (UAP) within the UK Air Defence Region and code named Project Condign, includes analyses of black triangle sightings. The report includes the statement that "the majority, if not all, of the hitherto unexplained reports may well be due to atmospheric gaseous electrically charged buoyant plasmas" that are "capable of being transported at enormous speeds under the influence and balance of electrical charges in the atmosphere." The report also notes that "at least some" of the black triangle observations likely arise from meteor entry into the atmosphere. 

Regarding the triangular shapes, the report also states: "Occasionally ... it seems that a field with, as yet, undetermined characteristics, can exist between certain charged buoyant objects in loose formation, such that, depending on the viewing aspect, the intervening space between them forms an area (viewed as a shape, often triangular) from which the reflection of light does not occur. This is a key finding in the attribution of what have frequently been reported as black 'craft,' often triangular and even up to hundreds of feet in length." A recommendation in the report is that no attempt be made on the part of aircraft to intercept or outmaneuver these objects, and instead to place them astern to mitigate the risk of collision. The report also speculates that the hypothesized plasma formations, through their "magnetic, electric or electromagnetic" fields, could have the potential to induce in observers vivid, but mainly incorrect, perceptions. 

The Project Condign report was not peer reviewed, and some authors have cast doubt on its scientific veracity.

Other sightings

1980s Hudson Valley sightings
During the early 1980s several hundred people claimed to have witnessed UFOs flying over, or near to, the Hudson River in New York state. These sightings involved hovering or slowly-flying, V-shaped objects rimmed with colorful lights. Several pilots claimed responsibility for these UFOs, reporting that the objects, some of which were tracked to a local airport and parking lot, were ultralight aircraft flown in formation.

1989–1992 Belgian wave

The Belgian UFO wave began in November 1989. The events of 29 November were documented by over thirty different groups of witnesses, and three separate groups of police officers. All of the reports related a large object flying at low altitude. The craft was of a flat, triangular shape, with lights underneath. This giant craft did not make a sound as it slowly moved across the landscape of Belgium. There was free sharing of information as the Belgian populace tracked this craft as it moved from the town of Liege to the border of the Netherlands and Germany.

In The Belgian UFO Wave of 1989–1992 – A Neglected Hypothesis, Renaud Leclet & co. discuss the fact that some sightings can be explained by helicopters. Most witnesses reported that the objects were silent. This report argues that the lack of noise could be due to the engine noise in the witnesses' automobiles, or strong natural wind blowing away from the witnesses.

Black triangle UFOs have been claimed to be visible to radar. During the 1989-1990 Belgian UFO wave, two Belgian Air Force F-16s attempted to intercept an object detected by radar, but the pilots did not report seeing an object. This entire Belgian UFO wave, however,  has been disputed by skeptics.

1997 Phoenix Lights incident

A widely reported appearance(s) of black triangles involved the "Phoenix Lights" events, during which multiple unidentified objects were observed near Phoenix, Arizona and videotaped by both the local media and residents beginning on Thursday, March 13, 1997. Some of the observed objects/lights appeared to be grouped in a large "V" formation that lingered for several minutes. Some residents reported one of the black triangles to be over a mile wide, and that it drifted slowly over their houses blocking out the stars of the night sky.

An official report from the US Air Force concluded that the military had been locally testing aircraft-launched flares during that time period.

2000 Southern Illinois incident
The "St. Clair Triangle", "UFO Over Illinois", "Southern Illinois UFO", or "Highland, Illinois UFO" sighting occurred on January 5, 2000 over the towns of Highland, Dupo, Lebanon, Shiloh, Summerfield, Millstadt, and O'Fallon, Illinois, beginning shortly after 4:00 am. The incident was featured in several television shows including Seeing is Believing, a Discovery Channel special UFOs Over Illinois, and an episode of the Syfy series Proof Positive. Sufjan Stevens included this incident in the song "Concerning the UFO Sighting Near Highland, Illinois" from his 2005 album Illinois.

Science writer Brian Dunning has reported that the observed object was identified by the FAA as an advertising blimp operated by the American Blimp Company.

2004–2006 Tinley Park Lights
Three red lights hovered in a triangular formation were seen by multiple witnesses in Tinley Park and Oak Forest, Illinois, on August 21, 2004, two months later on October 31, 2004, again on October 1, 2005, and once again on October 31, 2006. The lights were photographed and captured on video by some witnesses. According to some ufologists, the video evidence suggests that the lights kept the geometrical shape and moved as if they were attached to each other through a dark object. The incident was examined in a Dateline NBC episode on May 18, 2008, and in the episode "Invasion Illinois" of the television series UFO Hunters premiered on The History Channel on October 29, 2008.

Military aircraft
Classified military aircraft may be responsible for a number of black triangle UFO reports. Several such sightings have been reported over Antelope Valley, an area of desert in southern California. This stretch of desert draws people interested in potential "black project" aircraft, because it is close to several known military research and testing areas, such as Edwards Air Force Base in California, and United States Air Force Plant 42. A geographic analysis by the now-inactive National Institute for Discovery Science suggested that black triangles might be U.S. Air Force craft.

At least some of the proposed military types may be fictitious. The Northrop TR-3A Black Manta is a speculative surveillance aircraft purported to belong to the United States Air Force and to have been developed under a black project. It was said to be a subsonic stealth spy plane with a flying wing design. It was alleged to have been used in the Gulf War to provide laser designation for Lockheed F-117 Nighthawk bombers, for targeting to use with laser-guided bombs. There is little evidence to support the TR-3's existence; however it is possible that black triangle UFO reports associated with Black Manta could be a technology demonstrator for a potential new-generation tactical reconnaissance aircraft, and/or that TR-3 refers to a Technical Refresh of an existing programme.

Geoscientist Ben McGee has identified border patrol drones with infrared anti-collision or identification lights as an explanation of some black triangles.

References

Further reading
 "TR-3A Evolved From Classified Prototypes, Based on Tactical Penetrator Concept" Aviation Week & Space Technology, June 10, 1991. p 20-21
 “Triangular Recon Aircraft May be Supporting F-117A” AW&ST, June 10, 1991. p 20. William Scott
 "America's New Secret Aircraft" Popular Mechanics, December 1991. p. 32-5. Gregory T. Pope
 "Possible Black Aircraft Seen Flying In Formation with F-117As KC-135s." Aviation Week, March 9, 1992. p. 66–67
  Popular Science, March 1993
 "Stealth Watchers" Wired, Issue 2.02 February 1994. Phil Patton (article)
 Google Patent Search, patent Des. 244,265, issued May 10, 1977 (description)
 NBC Nightly News, August 6, 1997 segment showing U-2 with triangle on undercarriage (CIA, USAF)

External links

 

 UAP In the UK Air Defence Region Full Text (PDF)
 TR-3A at Federation of American Scientists

Stealth aircraft
Unidentified flying objects